Headgear is clothing worn on the head.

Headgear may also refer to:

 Headgear (martial arts), a helmet used for martial arts
 Headgear (artist group), a group of Japanese artists and writers
 Orthodontic headgear, an orthodontic appliance

Music 
 Headgear (band), a musical project of Daragh Dukes
 Headgear Studio, an American recording studio based in Williamsburg, Brooklyn
 "Headgear", a song from Adam Ant's unreleased Persuasion album

Other uses
 Headgear or headframe, the winding frame above an underground mine shaft